Interferon alpha-16, also known as IFN-alpha-16, is a protein that in humans is encoded by theIFNA16 gene.

References

Further reading